Agoos is a surname. Notable people with the surname include:

 Brad Agoos, American soccer player and coach
 Jeff Agoos (born 1968), American soccer player
 Julie Agoos (born 1956), American poet